The following lists events that happened during 1970 in the Democratic Republic of the Congo.

Incumbents
President – Mobutu Sese Seko

Events

References

Sources

1970 in the Democratic Republic of the Congo
Democratic Republic of the Congo
Congo, Democratic Republic